Megri may refer to:
 Fethiye, Turkey
 Meghri, Armenia
 Les Freres Megri, A Moroccan psychedelic rock band